is a Japanese pair skater. With partner Francis Boudreau-Audet, she is the 2016 Toruń Cup champion and a two-time Japanese national champion.

Early career 
Suto began learning to skate in 2006.

Partnership with Chizhikov 
Suto began her partnership with Konstantin Chizhikov in 2013. In December of the same year, they won the Japanese national junior title, ahead of Ami Koga / Francis Boudreau-Audet. Making their international debut, they placed 4th in junior pairs at the International Challenge Cup in March 2014. Later that month, the two finished 12th at the 2014 World Junior Championships in Sofia, Bulgaria.

Suto/Chizhikov competed in the 2014–15 ISU Junior Grand Prix series, placing 7th in Ostrava and 9th in Dresden. They were coached by Yuka Sato, Jason Dungjen, and Sergei Petrovski in Bloomfield Hills, Michigan.

Partnership with Boudreau-Audet

2015–16 season 
Suto teamed up with Francis Boudreau-Audet in the spring of 2015. They decided to represent Japan in senior pairs, coached by Richard Gauthier and Bruno Marcotte in Montreal, Canada. Their international debut came in December 2015 at the Golden Spin of Zagreb, where they placed 7th. Later that month, they won the Japanese national title, ahead of Marin Ono / Wesley Killing and Miu Suzaki / Ryuichi Kihara.

In January 2016, Suto/Boudreau-Audet were awarded gold at the Toruń Cup. They went on the place 9th at the 2016 Four Continents in Taipei and 22nd at the 2016 World Championships in Boston

2016–17 season 
Suto/Boudreau-Audet began their season on the Challenger Series, placing fourth at the 2016 U.S. International Classic. They finished 7th at their Grand Prix assignment, the 2016 NHK Trophy. The two repeated as Japanese national champions, outscoring Suzaki/Kihara by 14 points for the title.

Programs

With Boudreau-Audet

With Chizhikov

Competitive highlights 
GP: Grand Prix; CS: Challenger Series; JGP: Junior Grand Prix

With Boudreau-Audet

With Chizhikov

References

External links 
 

1997 births
Japanese female pair skaters
Living people
Sportspeople from Yokohama